This is a list of United States Army aircraft battalions. The aviation battalions in the US Army are generally attached to divisions, corps and armies and mostly consist of helicopters, both attack and reconnaissance. The helicopter battalions are often grouped into aviation brigades. There are also a few fixed-wing aircraft battalions, consisting of training aircraft, Beechcraft RC-12 Guardrail operational aircraft, and Beechcraft C-12 Huron / Cessna UC-35 transports for VIP personnel.

Cavalry Regiments

Aviation Regiments
 CAB = Combat Aviation Brigade

001-100

100-200

200-300

300-

Aviation Battalions

See also
 List of aviation companies of the United States Army

References

Citations

Bibliography

Wayne M. Dzmonchyk (compiler), Army Lineage Series - Aviation, Center of Military History Publication 60-12-1, Washington DC., 1986.

External links
 Summary of Army National Guard Aviation units, last date updated unknown.
 This site provides additional information on some of the Army Guard units which as yet have no article in the above list.

Aircraft battalions